A skyscraper is a tall continuously habitable building having multiple floors. Skyscrapers are very tall high-rise buildings. Historically, the term first referred to buildings with between 10 and 20 stories when these types of buildings began to be constructed in the 1880s. Skyscrapers may host offices, hotels, residential spaces, and retail spaces.

One common feature of skyscrapers is having a steel frame that supports curtain walls. This idea was invented by Viollet le Duc in his discourses on architecture. These curtain walls either bear on the framework below or are suspended from the framework above, rather than resting on load-bearing walls of conventional construction. Some early skyscrapers have a steel frame that enables the construction of load-bearing walls taller than of those made of reinforced concrete.

Modern skyscrapers' walls are not load-bearing, and most skyscrapers are characterised by large surface areas of windows made possible by steel frames and curtain walls. However, skyscrapers can have curtain walls that mimic conventional walls with a small surface area of windows. Modern skyscrapers often have a tubular structure, and are designed to act like a hollow cylinder to resist wind, seismic, and other lateral loads. To appear more slender, allow less wind exposure and transmit more daylight to the ground, many skyscrapers have a design with setbacks, which in some cases is also structurally required.

Definition

The term "skyscraper" was first applied to buildings of steel-framed construction of at least 10 storeys in the late 19th century, a result of public amazement at the tall buildings being built in major American cities like New York City, Philadelphia, Boston, Chicago, Detroit, and St. Louis.

Some point to Philadelphia's 10-storey Jayne Building (1849–50) as a proto-skyscraper, or to New York's seven-floor Equitable Life Building, built in 1870. Steel skeleton construction has allowed for today's supertall skyscrapers now being built worldwide. The nomination of one structure versus another being the first skyscraper, and why, depends on what factors are stressed.

The structural definition of the word skyscraper was refined later by architectural historians, based on engineering developments of the 1880s that had enabled construction of tall multi-storey buildings. This definition was based on the steel skeleton—as opposed to constructions of load-bearing masonry, which passed their practical limit in 1891 with Chicago's Monadnock Building.

— Louis Sullivan's The Tall Office Building Artistically Considered (1896)

Some structural engineers define a highrise as any vertical construction for which wind is a more significant load factor than earthquake or weight. Note that this criterion fits not only high-rises but some other tall structures, such as towers.

The tallest structure in ancient times was the  Great Pyramid of Giza in ancient Egypt, built in the 26th century BC. It was not surpassed in height for thousands of years, the  Lincoln Cathedral having exceeded it in 1311–1549, before its central spire collapsed. The latter in turn was not surpassed until the  Washington Monument in 1884. However, being uninhabited, none of these structures actually comply with the modern definition of a skyscraper.

High-rise apartments flourished in classical antiquity. Ancient Roman insulae in imperial cities reached 10 and more storeys. Beginning with Augustus (r. 30 BC-14 AD), several emperors attempted to establish limits of 20–25 m for multi-storey buildings, but were met with only limited success. Lower floors were typically occupied by shops or wealthy families, with the upper rented to the lower classes. Surviving Oxyrhynchus Papyri indicate that seven-storey buildings existed in provincial towns such as in 3rd century AD Hermopolis in Roman Egypt.

The skylines of many important medieval cities had large numbers of high-rise urban towers, built by the wealthy for defense and status. A Florentine law of 1251 decreed that all urban buildings be immediately reduced to less than 26 m. Even medium-sized towns of the era are known to have proliferations of towers, such as the 72 up to 51 m height in San Gimignano.

The medieval Egyptian city of Fustat housed many high-rise residential buildings, which Al-Muqaddasi in the 10th century described as resembling minarets. Nasir Khusraw in the early 11th century described some of them rising up to 14 storeys, with roof gardens on the top floor complete with ox-drawn water wheels for irrigating them. Cairo in the 16th century had high-rise apartment buildings where the two lower floors were for commercial and storage purposes and the multiple storeys above them were rented out to tenants. An early example of a city consisting entirely of high-rise housing is the 16th-century city of Shibam in Yemen. Shibam was made up of over 500 tower houses, each one rising 5 to 11 storeys high, with each floor being an apartment occupied by a single family. The city was built in this way in order to protect it from Bedouin attacks.

An early modern example of high-rise housing was in 17th-century Edinburgh, Scotland, where a defensive city wall defined the boundaries of the city. Due to the restricted land area available for development, the houses increased in height instead. Buildings of 11 storeys were common, and there are records of buildings as high as 14 storeys. Many of the stone-built structures can still be seen today in the old town of Edinburgh. The oldest iron framed building in the world, although only partially iron framed, is The Flaxmill (also locally known as the "Maltings"), in Shrewsbury, England. Built in 1797, it is seen as the "grandfather of skyscrapers", since its fireproof combination of cast iron columns and cast iron beams developed into the modern steel frame that made modern skyscrapers possible. In 2013 funding was confirmed to convert the derelict building into offices.

Early skyscrapers

In 1857, Elisha Otis introduced the safety elevator at the E.V. Haughwout Building in New York City, allowing convenient and safe transport to buildings' upper floors. Otis later introduced the first commercial passenger elevators to the Equitable Life Building in 1870, considered by some architectural historians to be the first skyscraper. Another crucial development was the use of a steel frame instead of stone or brick, otherwise the walls on the lower floors on a tall building would be too thick to be practical. An early development in this area was Oriel Chambers in Liverpool, England. It was only five floors high. The Royal Academy of Arts states, "critics at the time were horrified by its "large agglomerations of protruding plate glass bubbles". In fact, it was a precursor to Modernist architecture, being the first building in the world to feature a metal-framed glass curtain wall, a design element which creates light, airy interiors and has since been used the world over as a defining feature of skyscrapers".

Further developments led to what many individuals and organizations consider the world's first skyscraper, the ten-story Home Insurance Building in Chicago, built in 1884–1885. While its original height of 42.1 m (138 ft) does not even qualify as a skyscraper today, it was record setting. The building of tall buildings in the 1880s gave the skyscraper its first architectural movement, broadly termed the Chicago School, which developed what has been called the Commercial Style.

The architect, Major William Le Baron Jenney, created a load-bearing structural frame. In this building, a steel frame supported the entire weight of the walls, instead of load-bearing walls carrying the weight of the building. This development led to the "Chicago skeleton" form of construction. In addition to the steel frame, the Home Insurance Building also utilized fireproofing, elevators, and electrical wiring, key elements in most skyscrapers today.

Burnham and Root's  Rand McNally Building in Chicago, 1889, was the first all-steel framed skyscraper, while Louis Sullivan's  Wainwright Building in St. Louis, Missouri, 1891, was the first steel-framed building with soaring vertical bands to emphasize the height of the building and is therefore considered to be the first early skyscraper. In 1889, the Mole Antonelliana in Italy was 167 m (549 ft) tall.

Most early skyscrapers emerged in the land-strapped areas of New York City and Chicago toward the end of the 19th century. A land boom in Melbourne, Australia between 1888 and 1891 spurred the creation of a significant number of early skyscrapers, though none of these were steel reinforced and few remain today. Height limits and fire restrictions were later introduced. In the late 1800s, London builders found building heights limited due to issues with existing buildings. High-rise development in London is restricted at certain sites if it would obstruct protected views of St Paul's Cathedral and other historic buildings. This policy, 'St Paul’s Heights', has officially been in operation since 1937.

Concerns about aesthetics and fire safety had likewise hampered the development of skyscrapers across continental Europe for the first half of the 20th century.

Modern skyscrapers
Modern skyscrapers are built with steel or reinforced concrete frameworks and curtain walls of glass or polished stone. They use mechanical equipment such as water pumps and elevators. Since the 1960s, according to the CTBUH, the skyscraper has been reoriented away from a symbol for North American corporate power to instead communicate a city or nation's place in the world.

Skyscraper construction entered a three-decades-long era of stagnation in 1930 due to the Great Depression and then World War II. Shortly after the war ended, the Soviet Union began construction on a series of skyscrapers in Moscow. Seven, dubbed the "Seven Sisters", were built between 1947 and 1953; and one, the Main building of Moscow State University, was the tallest building in Europe for nearly four decades (1953–1990). Other skyscrapers in the style of Socialist Classicism were erected in East Germany (Frankfurter Tor), Poland (PKiN), Ukraine (Hotel Ukrayina), Latvia (Academy of Sciences), and other Eastern Bloc countries. Western European countries also began to permit taller skyscrapers during the years immediately following World War II. Early examples include Edificio España (Spain) and Torre Breda (Italy).

From the 1930s onward, skyscrapers began to appear in various cities in East and Southeast Asia as well as in Latin America. Finally, they also began to be constructed in cities in Africa, the Middle East, South Asia, and Oceania from the late 1950s.

Skyscraper projects after World War II typically rejected the classical designs of the early skyscrapers, instead embracing the uniform international style; many older skyscrapers were redesigned to suit contemporary tastes or even demolished—such as New York's Singer Building, once the world's tallest skyscraper.

German-American architect Ludwig Mies van der Rohe became one of the world's most renowned architects in the second half of the 20th century. He conceived the glass façade skyscraper and, along with Norwegian Fred Severud, designed the Seagram Building in 1958, a skyscraper that is often regarded as the pinnacle of modernist high-rise architecture.

Skyscraper construction surged throughout the 1960s. The impetus behind the upswing was a series of transformative innovations which made it possible for people to live and work in "cities in the sky".

In the early 1960s Bangladeshi-American structural engineer Fazlur Rahman Khan, considered the "father of tubular designs" for high-rises, discovered that the dominating rigid steel frame structure was not the only system apt for tall buildings, marking a new era of skyscraper construction in terms of multiple structural systems. His central innovation in skyscraper design and construction was the concept of the "tube" structural system, including the "framed tube", "trussed tube", and "bundled tube". His "tube concept", using all the exterior wall perimeter structure of a building to simulate a thin-walled tube, revolutionized tall building design. These systems allow greater economic efficiency, and also allow skyscrapers to take on various shapes, no longer needing to be rectangular and box-shaped. The first building to employ the tube structure was the Chestnut De-Witt apartment building, considered to be a major development in modern architecture. These new designs opened an economic door for contractors, engineers, architects, and investors, providing vast amounts of real estate space on minimal plots of land. Over the next fifteen years, many towers were built by Fazlur Rahman Khan and the "Second Chicago School", including the hundred-storey John Hancock Center and the massive  Willis Tower. Other pioneers of this field include Hal Iyengar, William LeMessurier, and Minoru Yamasaki, the architect of the World Trade Center.

Many buildings designed in the 70s lacked a particular style and recalled ornamentation from earlier buildings designed before the 50s. These design plans ignored the environment and loaded structures with decorative elements and extravagant finishes. This approach to design was opposed by Fazlur Khan and he considered the designs to be whimsical rather than rational. Moreover, he considered the work to be a waste of precious natural resources. Khan's work promoted structures integrated with architecture and the least use of material resulting in the smallest impact on the environment. The next era of skyscrapers will focus on the environment including performance of structures, types of material, construction practices, absolute minimal use of materials/natural resources, embodied energy within the structures, and more importantly, a holistically integrated building systems approach.

Modern building practices regarding supertall structures have led to the study of "vanity height". Vanity height, according to the CTBUH, is the distance between the highest floor and its architectural top (excluding antennae, flagpole or other functional extensions). Vanity height first appeared in New York City skyscrapers as early as the 1920s and 1930s but supertall buildings have relied on such uninhabitable extensions for on average 30% of their height, raising potential definitional and sustainability issues. The current era of skyscrapers focuses on sustainability, its built and natural environments, including the performance of structures, types of materials, construction practices, absolute minimal use of materials and natural resources, energy within the structure, and a holistically integrated building systems approach. LEED is a current green building standard.

Architecturally, with the movements of Postmodernism, New Urbanism and New Classical Architecture, that established since the 1980s, a more classical approach came back to global skyscraper design, that remains popular today. Examples are the Wells Fargo Center, NBC Tower, Parkview Square, 30 Park Place, the Messeturm, the iconic Petronas Towers and Jin Mao Tower.

Other contemporary styles and movements in skyscraper design include organic, sustainable, neo-futurist, structuralist, high-tech, deconstructivist, blob, digital, streamline, novelty, critical regionalist, vernacular, Neo Art Deco and neohistorist, also known as revivalist.

3 September is the global commemorative day for skyscrapers, called "Skyscraper Day".

New York City developers competed among themselves, with successively taller buildings claiming the title of "world's tallest" in the 1920s and early 1930s, culminating with the completion of the  Chrysler Building in 1930 and the  Empire State Building in 1931, the world's tallest building for forty years. However, it was overtaken by the Sears Tower (now Willis Tower) in Chicago within two years.

Design and construction

The design and construction of skyscrapers involves creating safe, habitable spaces in very tall buildings. The buildings must support their weight, resist wind and earthquakes, and protect occupants from fire. Yet they must also be conveniently accessible, even on the upper floors, and provide utilities and a comfortable climate for the occupants. The problems posed in skyscraper design are considered among the most complex encountered given the balances required between economics, engineering, and construction management.

One common feature of skyscrapers is a steel framework from which curtain walls are suspended, rather than load-bearing walls of conventional construction. Most skyscrapers have a steel frame that enables them to be built taller than typical load-bearing walls of reinforced concrete. Skyscrapers usually have a particularly small surface area of what are conventionally thought of as walls. Because the walls are not load-bearing most skyscrapers are characterized by surface areas of windows made possible by the concept of steel frame and curtain wall. However, skyscrapers can also have curtain walls that mimic conventional walls and have a small surface area of windows.

The concept of a skyscraper is a product of the industrialized age, made possible by cheap fossil fuel derived energy and industrially refined raw materials such as steel and concrete. The construction of skyscrapers was enabled by steel frame construction that surpassed brick and mortar construction starting at the end of the 19th century and finally surpassing it in the 20th century together with reinforced concrete construction as the price of steel decreased and labor costs increased.

The steel frames become inefficient and uneconomic for supertall buildings as usable floor space is reduced for progressively larger supporting columns. Since about 1960, tubular designs have been used for high rises. This reduces the usage of material (more efficient in economic terms – Willis Tower uses a third less steel than the Empire State Building) yet allows greater height. It allows fewer interior columns, and so creates more usable floor space. It further enables buildings to take on various shapes.

Elevators are characteristic to skyscrapers. In 1852 Elisha Otis introduced the safety elevator, allowing convenient and safe passenger movement to upper floors. Another crucial development was the use of a steel frame instead of stone or brick, otherwise the walls on the lower floors on a tall building would be too thick to be practical. Today major manufacturers of elevators include Otis, ThyssenKrupp, Schindler, and KONE.

Advances in construction techniques have allowed skyscrapers to narrow in width, while increasing in height. Some of these new techniques include mass dampers to reduce vibrations and swaying, and gaps to allow air to pass through, reducing wind shear.

Basic design considerations
Good structural design is important in most building design, but particularly for skyscrapers since even a small chance of catastrophic failure is unacceptable given the high price. This presents a paradox to civil engineers: the only way to assure a lack of failure is to test for all modes of failure, in both the laboratory and the real world. But the only way to know of all modes of failure is to learn from previous failures. Thus, no engineer can be absolutely sure that a given structure will resist all loadings that could cause failure, but can only have large enough margins of safety such that a failure is acceptably unlikely. When buildings do fail, engineers question whether the failure was due to some lack of foresight or due to some unknowable factor.

Loading and vibration
The load a skyscraper experiences is largely from the force of the building material itself. In most building designs, the weight of the structure is much larger than the weight of the material that it will support beyond its own weight. In technical terms, the dead load, the load of the structure, is larger than the live load, the weight of things in the structure (people, furniture, vehicles, etc.). As such, the amount of structural material required within the lower levels of a skyscraper will be much larger than the material required within higher levels. This is not always visually apparent. The Empire State Building's setbacks are actually a result of the building code at the time (1916 Zoning Resolution), and were not structurally required. On the other hand, John Hancock Center's shape is uniquely the result of how it supports loads. Vertical supports can come in several types, among which the most common for skyscrapers can be categorized as steel frames, concrete cores, tube within tube design, and shear walls.

The wind loading on a skyscraper is also considerable. In fact, the lateral wind load imposed on supertall structures is generally the governing factor in the structural design. Wind pressure increases with height, so for very tall buildings, the loads associated with wind are larger than dead or live loads.

Other vertical and horizontal loading factors come from varied, unpredictable sources, such as earthquakes.

Steel frame
By 1895, steel had replaced cast iron as skyscrapers' structural material. Its malleability allowed it to be formed into a variety of shapes, and it could be riveted, ensuring strong connections. The simplicity of a steel frame eliminated the inefficient part of a shear wall, the central portion, and consolidated support members in a much stronger fashion by allowing both horizontal and vertical supports throughout. Among steel's drawbacks is that as more material must be supported as height increases, the distance between supporting members must decrease, which in turn increases the amount of material that must be supported. This becomes inefficient and uneconomic for buildings above 40 storeys tall as usable floor spaces are reduced for supporting column and due to more usage of steel.

Tube structural systems

A new structural system of framed tubes was developed by Fazlur Rahman Khan in 1963. The framed tube structure is defined as "a three dimensional space structure composed of three, four, or possibly more frames, braced frames, or shear walls, joined at or near their edges to form a vertical tube-like structural system capable of resisting lateral forces in any direction by cantilevering from the foundation". Closely spaced interconnected exterior columns form the tube. Horizontal loads (primarily wind) are supported by the structure as a whole. Framed tubes allow fewer interior columns, and so create more usable floor space, and about half the exterior surface is available for windows. Where larger openings like garage doors are required, the tube frame must be interrupted, with transfer girders used to maintain structural integrity. Tube structures cut down costs, at the same time allowing buildings to reach greater heights. Concrete tube-frame construction was first used in the DeWitt-Chestnut Apartment Building, completed in Chicago in 1963, and soon after in the John Hancock Center and World Trade Center.

The tubular systems are fundamental to tall building design. Most buildings over 40-storeys constructed since the 1960s now use a tube design derived from Khan's structural engineering principles, examples including the construction of the World Trade Center, Aon Center, Petronas Towers, Jin Mao Building, and most other supertall skyscrapers since the 1960s. The strong influence of tube structure design is also evident in the construction of the current tallest skyscraper, the Burj Khalifa.

Trussed tube and X-bracing:

Khan pioneered several other variations of the tube structure design. One of these was the concept of X-bracing, or the trussed tube, first employed for the John Hancock Center. This concept reduced the lateral load on the building by transferring the load into the exterior columns. This allows for a reduced need for interior columns thus creating more floor space. This concept can be seen in the John Hancock Center, designed in 1965 and completed in 1969. One of the most famous buildings of the structural expressionist style, the skyscraper's distinctive X-bracing exterior is actually a hint that the structure's skin is indeed part of its 'tubular system'. This idea is one of the architectural techniques the building used to climb to record heights (the tubular system is essentially the spine that helps the building stand upright during wind and earthquake loads). This X-bracing allows for both higher performance from tall structures and the ability to open up the inside floorplan (and usable floor space) if the architect desires.

The John Hancock Center was far more efficient than earlier steel-frame structures. Where the Empire State Building (1931), required about 206 kilograms of steel per square metre and 28 Liberty Street (1961) required 275, the John Hancock Center required only 145. The trussed tube concept was applied to many later skyscrapers, including the Onterie Center, Citigroup Center and Bank of China Tower.

Bundled tube:
An important variation on the tube frame is the bundled tube, which uses several interconnected tube frames. The Willis Tower in Chicago used this design, employing nine tubes of varying height to achieve its distinct appearance. The bundled tube structure meant that "buildings no longer need be boxlike in appearance: they could become sculpture."

Tube in tube:
Tube-in-tube system takes advantage of core shear wall tubes in addition to exterior tubes. The inner tube and outer tube work together to resist gravity loads and lateral loads and to provide additional rigidity to the structure to prevent significant deflections at the top. This design was first used in One Shell Plaza. Later buildings to use this structural system include the Petronas Towers.

Outrigger and belt truss:
The outrigger and belt truss system is a lateral load resisting system in which the tube structure is connected to the central core wall with very stiff outriggers and belt trusses at one or more levels. BHP House was the first building to use this structural system followed by the First Wisconsin Center, since renamed U.S. Bank Center, in Milwaukee. The center rises 601 feet, with three belt trusses at the bottom, middle and top of the building. The exposed belt trusses serve aesthetic and structural purposes. Later buildings to use this include Shanghai World Financial Center.

Concrete tube structures:
The last major buildings engineered by Khan were the One Magnificent Mile and Onterie Center in Chicago, which employed his bundled tube and trussed tube system designs respectively. In contrast to his earlier buildings, which were mainly steel, his last two buildings were concrete. His earlier DeWitt-Chestnut Apartments building, built in 1963 in Chicago, was also a concrete building with a tube structure. Trump Tower in New York City is also another example that adapted this system.

Shear wall frame interaction system:
Khan developed the shear wall frame interaction system for mid high-rise buildings. This structural system uses combinations of shear walls and frames designed to resist lateral forces. The first building to use this structural system was the 35-stories Brunswick Building. The Brunswick building was completed in 1965 and became the tallest reinforced concrete structure of its time. The structural system of Brunswick Building consists of a concrete shear wall core surrounded by an outer concrete frame of columns and spandrels. Apartment buildings up to 70 stories high have successfully used this concept.

The elevator conundrum
The invention of the elevator was a precondition for the invention of skyscrapers, given that most people would not (or could not) climb more than a few flights of stairs at a time. The elevators in a skyscraper are not simply a necessary utility, like running water and electricity, but are in fact closely related to the design of the whole structure: a taller building requires more elevators to service the additional floors, but the elevator shafts consume valuable floor space. If the service core, which contains the elevator shafts, becomes too big, it can reduce the profitability of the building. Architects must therefore balance the value gained by adding height against the value lost to the expanding service core.

Many tall buildings use elevators in a non-standard configuration to reduce their footprint. Buildings such as the former World Trade Center Towers and Chicago's John Hancock Center use sky lobbies, where express elevators take passengers to upper floors which serve as the base for local elevators. This allows architects and engineers to place elevator shafts on top of each other, saving space. Sky lobbies and express elevators take up a significant amount of space, however, and add to the amount of time spent commuting between floors.

Other buildings, such as the Petronas Towers, use double-deck elevators, allowing more people to fit in a single elevator, and reaching two floors at every stop. It is possible to use even more than two levels on an elevator, although this has never been done. The main problem with double-deck elevators is that they cause everyone in the elevator to stop when only person on one level needs to get off at a given floor.

Buildings with sky lobbies include the World Trade Center, Petronas Twin Towers, Willis Tower and Taipei 101. The 44th-floor sky lobby of the John Hancock Center also featured the first high-rise indoor swimming pool, which remains the highest in the United States.

Economic rationale

Skyscrapers are usually situated in city centers where the price of land is high. Constructing a skyscraper becomes justified if the price of land is so high that it makes economic sense to build upward as to minimize the cost of the land per the total floor area of a building. Thus the construction of skyscrapers is dictated by economics and results in skyscrapers in a certain part of a large city unless a building code restricts the height of buildings.

Skyscrapers are rarely seen in small cities and they are characteristic of large cities, because of the critical importance of high land prices for the construction of skyscrapers. Usually only office, commercial and hotel users can afford the rents in the city center and thus most tenants of skyscrapers are of these classes.

Today, skyscrapers are an increasingly common sight where land is expensive, as in the centers of big cities, because they provide such a high ratio of rentable floor space per unit area of land.

Another disadvantage of very high skyscrapers is the loss of usable floorspace, as many elevator shafts are needed to enable performant vertical travelling. This led to the introduction of express lifts and sky lobbies where transfer to slower distribution lifts can be done.

Environmental impact

Constructing a single skyscraper requires large quantities of materials like steel, concrete, and glass, and these materials represent significant embodied energy. Skyscrapers are thus material and energy intensive buildings.

Skyscrapers have considerable mass, requiring a stronger foundation than a shorter, lighter building. In construction, building materials must be lifted to the top of a skyscraper during construction, requiring more energy than would be necessary at lower heights. Furthermore, a skyscraper consumes much electricity because potable and non-potable water have to be pumped to the highest occupied floors, skyscrapers are usually designed to be mechanically ventilated, elevators are generally used instead of stairs, and electric lights are needed in rooms far from the windows and windowless spaces such as elevators, bathrooms and stairwells.

Skyscrapers can be artificially lit and the energy requirements can be covered by renewable energy or other electricity generation with low greenhouse gas emissions. Heating and cooling of skyscrapers can be efficient, because of centralized HVAC systems, heat radiation blocking windows and small surface area of the building. There is Leadership in Energy and Environmental Design (LEED) certification for skyscrapers. For example, the Empire State Building received a gold Leadership in Energy and Environmental Design rating in September 2011 and the Empire State Building is the tallest LEED certified building in the United States, proving that skyscrapers can be environmentally friendly. The 30 St Mary Axe in London, the United Kingdom is another example of an environmentally friendly skyscraper.

In the lower levels of a skyscraper a larger percentage of the building floor area must be devoted to the building structure and services than is required for lower buildings:
 More structure – because it must be stronger to support more floors above
 The elevator conundrum creates the need for more lift shafts—everyone comes in at the bottom and they all have to pass through the lower part of the building to get to the upper levels.
 Building services – power and water enter the building from below and have to pass through the lower levels to get to the upper levels.

In low-rise structures, the support rooms (chillers, transformers, boilers, pumps and air handling units) can be put in basements or roof space—areas which have low rental value. There is, however, a limit to how far this plant can be located from the area it serves. The farther away it is the larger the risers for ducts and pipes from this plant to the floors they serve and the more floor area these risers take. In practice this means that in highrise buildings this plant is located on 'plant levels' at intervals up the building.

Operational energy

The building sector accounts for approximately 50% of greenhouse gas emissions, with operational energy accounting for 80-90% of building related energy use. Operational energy use is affected by the magnitude of conduction between the interior and exterior, convection from infiltrating air, and radiation through glazing. The extent to which these factors affect the operational energy vary depending on the microclimate of the skyscraper, with increased wind speeds as the height of the skyscraper increases, and a decrease in the dry bulb temperature as the altitude increases. For example, when moving from 1.5 meters to 284 meters, the dry bulb temperature decreased by 1.85oC while the wind speeds increased from 2.46 meters per seconds to 7.75 meters per second, which led to a 2.4% decrease in summer cooling in reference to the Freedom Tower in New York City. However, for the same building it was found that the annual energy use intensity was 9.26% higher because of the lack of shading at high altitudes which increased the cooling loads for the remainder of the year while a combination of temperature, wind, shading, and the effects of reflections led to a combined 13.13% increase in annual energy use intensity. In a study performed by Leung and Ray in 2013, it was found that the average energy use intensity of a structure with between 0 and 9 floors was approximately 80 kBtu/ft/yr, while the energy use intensity of a structure with more than 50 floors was about 117 kBtu/ft/yr. Refer to Figure 1 to see the breakdown of how intermediate heights affect the energy use intensity. The slight decrease in energy use intensity over 30-39 floors can be attributed to the fact that the increase in pressure within the heating, cooling, and water distribution systems levels out at a point between 40 and 49 floors and the energy savings due to the microclimate of higher floors are able to be seen.  There is a gap in data in which another study looking at the same information but for taller buildings is needed.

Elevators

A portion of the operational energy increase in tall buildings is related to the usage of elevators because the distance traveled and the speed at which they travel increases as the height of the building increases. Between 5 and 25% of the total energy consumed in a tall building is from the use of elevators. As the height of the building increases it is also more inefficient because of the presence of higher drag and friction losses.

Embodied energy

The embodied energy associated with the construction of skyscrapers varies based on the materials used. Embodied energy is quantified per unit of material. Skyscrapers inherently have higher embodied energy than low-rise buildings due to the increase in material used as more floors are built. Figures 2 and 3 compare the total embodied energy of different floor types and the unit embodied energy per floor type for buildings with between 20 and 70 stories. For all floor types except for steel-concrete floors, it was found that after 60 stories, there was a decrease in unit embodied energy but when considering all floors, there was exponential growth due to a double dependence on height. The first of which is the relationship between an increase in height leading to an increase in the quantity of materials used, and the second being the increase in height leading to an increase in size of elements to increase the structural capacity of the building. A careful choice in building materials can likely reduce the embodied energy without reducing the number of floors constructed within the bounds presented.

Embodied carbon

Similar to embodied energy, the embodied carbon of a building is dependent on the materials chosen for its construction. Figures 4 and 5 show the total embodied carbon for different structure types for increasing numbers of stories and the embodied carbon per square meter of gross floor area for the same structure types as the number of stories increases. Both methods of measuring the embodied carbon show that there is a point where the embodied carbon is lowest before increasing again as the height increases. For the total embodied carbon it is dependent on the structure type, but is either around 40 stories, or approximately 60 stories. For the square meter of gross floor area, the lowest embodied carbon was found at either 40 stories, or approximately 70 stories.

Air pollution

In urban areas, the configuration of buildings can lead to exacerbated wind patterns and an uneven dispersion of pollutants. When the height of buildings surrounding a source of air pollution is increased, the size and occurrence of both "dead-zones" and "hotspots" were increased in areas where there were almost no pollutants and high concentrations of pollutants, respectively. Figure 6 depicts the progression of a Building F's height increasing from 0.0315 units in Case 1, to 0.2 units in Case 2, to 0.6 units in Case 3. This progression shows how as the height of Building F increases, the dispersion of pollutants decreases, but the concentration within the building cluster increases. The variation of velocity fields can be affected by the construction of new buildings as well, rather than solely the increase in height as shown in the figure. As urban centers continue to expand upward and outward, the present velocity fields will continue to trap polluted air close to the tall buildings within the city. Specifically within major cities, a majority of air pollution is derived from transportation, whether it be cars, trains, planes, or boats. As urban sprawl continues and pollutants continue to be emitted, the air pollutants will continue to be trapped within these urban centers. Different pollutants can be detrimental to human health in different ways. For example, particulate matter from vehicular exhaust and power generation can cause asthma, bronchitis, and cancer, while nitrogen dioxide from motor engine combustion processes can cause neurological disfunction and asphyxiation.

LEED/green building rating

Like with all other buildings, if special measures are taken to incorporate sustainable design methods early on in the design process, it is possible to obtain a green building rating, such as a Leadership in Energy and Environmental Design (LEED) certification. An integrated design approach is crucial in making sure that design decisions that positively impact the whole building are made at the beginning of the process. Because of the massive scale of skyscrapers, the decisions made by the design team must take all factors into account, including the buildings impact on the surrounding community, the effect of the building on the direction in which air and water move, and the impact of the construction process, must be taken into account. There are several design methods that could be employed in the construction of a skyscraper that would take advantage of the height of the building. The microclimates that exist as the height of the building increases can be taken advantage of to increase the natural ventilation, decrease the cooling load, and increase daylighting. Natural ventilation can be increased by utilizing the stack effect, in which warm air moves upward and increases the movement of the air within the building. If utilizing the stack effect, buildings must take extra care to design for fire separation techniques, as the stack effect can also exacerbate the severity of a fire. Skyscrapers are considered to be internally dominated buildings because of their size as well as the fact that a majority are used as some sort of office building with high cooling loads. Due to the microclimate created at the upper floors with the increased wind speed and the decreased dry bulb temperatures, the cooling load will naturally be reduced because of infiltration through the thermal envelope. By taking advantage of the naturally cooler temperatures at higher altitudes, skyscrapers can reduce their cooling loads passively. On the other side of this argument, is the lack of shading at higher altitudes by other buildings, so the solar heat gain will be larger for higher floors than for floors at the lower end of the building. Special measures should be taken to shade upper floors from sunlight during the overheated period to ensure thermal comfort without increasing the cooling load.

History of the tallest skyscrapers

At the beginning of the 20th century, New York City was a center for the Beaux-Arts architectural movement, attracting the talents of such great architects as Stanford White and Carrere and Hastings. As better construction and engineering technology became available as the century progressed, New York City and Chicago became the focal point of the competition for the tallest building in the world. Each city's striking skyline has been composed of numerous and varied skyscrapers, many of which are icons of 20th-century architecture:

 The E. V. Haughwout Building in Manhattan was the first building to successfully install a passenger elevator, doing so on 23 March 1857.
 The Equitable Life Building in Manhattan was the first office building to feature passenger elevators.
 The Home Insurance Building in Chicago, which was built in 1884, was the first tall building with a steel skeleton.
 The Singer Building, an expansion to an existing structure in Lower Manhattan was the world's tallest building when completed in 1908.
 The Metropolitan Life Insurance Company Tower, across Madison Square Park from the Flatiron Building, was the world's tallest building when completed in 1909.
 The Woolworth Building, a neo-Gothic "Cathedral of Commerce" overlooking New York City Hall, was designed by Cass Gilbert. At 792 feet (241 m), it became the world's tallest building upon its completion in 1913, an honor it retained until 1930.
 40 Wall Street, a 71-story,  neo-Gothic tower designed by H. Craig Severance, was the world's tallest building for a month in May 1930. 
 The Chrysler Building in New York City took the lead in late May 1930 as the tallest building in the world, reaching 1,046 feet (319 m). Designed by William Van Alen, an Art Deco style masterpiece with an exterior crafted of brick, the Chrysler Building continues to be a favorite of New Yorkers to this day.
 The Empire State Building, nine streets south of the Chrysler in Manhattan, topped out at 1,250 feet (381 m) and 102 stories in 1931.  The first building to have more than 100 floors, it was designed by Shreve, Lamb and Harmon in the contemporary Art Deco style and takes its name from the nickname of New York State. The antenna mast added in 1951 brought pinnacle height to 1,472 feet (449 m), lowered in 1984 to 1,454 feet (443 m).
 The World Trade Center officially surpassed the Empire State Building in 1970, was completed in 1973, and consisted of two tall towers and several smaller buildings. For a short time the World Trade Center's North Tower―completed in 1972―was the world's tallest building, until surpassed by Sears Tower in 1973. Upon completion, the towers stood for 28 years, until the September 11 attacks destroyed the buildings in 2001.
 The Willis Tower (formerly Sears Tower) was completed in 1974. It was the first building to employ the "bundled tube" structural system, designed by Fazlur Khan. It was surpassed in height by the Petronas Towers in 1998, but remained the tallest in some categories until Burj Khalifa surpassed it in all categories in 2010. It is currently the second tallest building in the United States, after One World Trade Center, which was built to replace the destroyed Trade Towers.

Momentum in setting records passed from the United States to other nations with the opening of the Petronas Twin Towers in Kuala Lumpur, Malaysia, in 1998. The record for the world's tallest building has remained in Asia since the opening of Taipei 101 in Taipei, Taiwan, in 2004. A number of architectural records, including those of the world's tallest building and tallest free-standing structure, moved to the Middle East with the opening of the Burj Khalifa in Dubai, United Arab Emirates.

This geographical transition is accompanied by a change in approach to skyscraper design. For much of the 20th century large buildings took the form of simple geometrical shapes. This reflected the "international style" or modernist philosophy shaped by Bauhaus architects early in the century. The last of these, the Willis Tower and World Trade Center towers in New York, erected in the 1970s, reflect the philosophy. Tastes shifted in the decade which followed, and new skyscrapers began to exhibit postmodernist influences. This approach to design avails itself of historical elements, often adapted and re-interpreted, in creating technologically modern structures. The Petronas Twin Towers recall Asian pagoda architecture and Islamic geometric principles. Taipei 101 likewise reflects the pagoda tradition as it incorporates ancient motifs such as the ruyi symbol. The Burj Khalifa draws inspiration from traditional Islamic art. Architects in recent years have sought to create structures that would not appear equally at home if set in any part of the world, but that reflect the culture thriving in the spot where they stand.

The following list measures height of the roof, not the pinnacle. The more common gauge is the "highest architectural detail"; such ranking would have included Petronas Towers, built in 1996.

Gallery

Future developments

Proposals for such structures have been put forward, including the Burj Mubarak Al Kabir in Kuwait and Azerbaijan Tower in Baku. Kilometer-plus structures present architectural challenges that may eventually place them in a new architectural category. The first building under construction and planned to be over one kilometre tall is the Jeddah Tower.

Wooden skyscrapers

Several wooden skyscraper designs have been designed and built. A 14-storey housing project in Bergen, Norway known as 'Treet' or 'The Tree' became the world's tallest wooden apartment block when it was completed in late 2015. The Tree's record was eclipsed by Brock Commons, an 18-storey wooden dormitory at the University of British Columbia in Canada, when it was completed in September 2016.

A 40-storey residential building 'Trätoppen' has been proposed by architect Anders Berensson to be built in Stockholm, Sweden. Trätoppen would be the tallest building in Stockholm, though there are no immediate plans to begin construction. The tallest currently-planned wooden skyscraper is the 70-storey W350 Project in Tokyo, to be built by the Japanese wood products company Sumitomo Forestry Co. to celebrate its 350th anniversary in 2041. An 80-storey wooden skyscraper, the River Beech Tower, has been proposed by a team including architects Perkins + Will and the University of Cambridge. The River Beech Tower, on the banks of the Chicago River in Chicago, Illinois, would be 348 feet shorter than the W350 Project despite having 10 more storeys.

Wooden skyscrapers are estimated to be around a quarter of the weight of an equivalent reinforced-concrete structure as well as reducing the building carbon footprint by 60–75%. Buildings have been designed using cross-laminated timber (CLT) which gives a higher rigidity and strength to wooden structures. CLT panels are prefabricated and can therefore save on building time.

See also

 CTBUH Skyscraper Award
 Emporis Skyscraper Award
 Groundscraper
 List of cities with the most skyscrapers
 List of tallest buildings
 List of tallest buildings and structures
 Plyscraper
 Seascraper
 Skyscraper design and construction
 Skyscraper Index
 Skyscraper Museum in NYC
 Skyscrapers in film
 Skyline
 Vertical farming, "farmscrapers"
 World's littlest skyscraper
 drag-coefficient
 material-fatigue
 down-force
 Steel frame

References

Further reading
  
Judith Dupré. Skyscrapers: A History of the World's Most Extraordinary Buildings-Revised and Updated. (2013). Hachette/Black Dog & Leventhal. 2013 ed.:  
Skyscrapers: Form and Function, by David Bennett, Simon & Schuster, 1995.
 
 Willis, Carol, Form Follows Finance: Skyscrapers and Skylines in New York and Chicago. Princeton Architectural Press, 1995. 224 P. 
 Van Leeuwen, Thomas A P, The Skyward Trend of Thought: The Metaphysics of the American Skyscraper, Cambridge: MIT Press, 1988.

External links

 
 Council on Tall Buildings and Urban Habitat
 SkyscraperCity construction updates magazine
 Skyscraper definition on Phorio Standards
 Skyscraper Museum
 SkyscraperPage Technical information and diagrams

 
Structural engineering
Structural system
Articles containing video clips
Building types